The Harvey Cross House is a historic residence in Oregon City, Oregon, United States. It was built –1890, then relocated within Oregon City , and is one of the finest, most stately examples of Italianate residential architecture in the city. The house was built for Harvey Cross, an investor in the Barlow Road and founder, with partners, founded the Gladstone Real Estate Association, which eventually led to the establishment of the city of Gladstone, Oregon. He served as a county judge and state senator, and promoted Chautauqua in the Willamette Valley.

The house was listed on the National Register of Historic Places in 1979.

See also
National Register of Historic Places listings in Clackamas County, Oregon

References

External links

Historic resource summary, Oregon City Planning Department

Houses on the National Register of Historic Places in Oregon
Buildings and structures in Oregon City, Oregon
National Register of Historic Places in Clackamas County, Oregon
Houses in Clackamas County, Oregon
1885 establishments in Oregon